The 1937–38 season was Blackpool F.C.'s 37th season (34th consecutive) in the Football League. They competed in the 22-team Division One, then the top tier of English football, finishing twelfth.

Bobby Finan, the club's top scorer for the previous two seasons, shared the accolade this season with Willie Buchan, with twelve goals each in all competitions.

Table

Notes

References

Blackpool F.C.
Blackpool F.C. seasons